Legion Stadium is a 6,000 seat stadium located in Wilmington, North Carolina.  It is part of the Legion Sports Complex and was home of the Wilmington Hammerheads of the Premier Development League.

Originally built in the 1930s, the facility received several renovations over the years, including a recent one in 2011.  The stadium has 3,500 seats in the grandstand and 2,500 visitor seats.  It also has 40 handicapped seats and a  parking lot.

References

External links
Legion Stadium

Sports venues in Wilmington, North Carolina
Soccer venues in North Carolina
Wilmington Hammerheads FC
1930s establishments in North Carolina
Sports venues completed in the 1930s